Tsukuda (written: 佃 lit. "cultivated rice field") is a Japanese surname. Notable people with the surname include:

, Japanese businessman
, Japanese footballer
, Japanese cyclist

See also
Tsukuda Station (disambiguation), multiple train stations in Japan

Japanese-language surnames